Melverley is a civil parish in Shropshire, England.  It contains four listed buildings that are recorded in the National Heritage List for England.  Of these, one is listed at Grade I, the highest of the three grades, and the others are at Grade II, the lowest grade.  The parish contains the village of Melverley and is otherwise rural.  The listed buildings consist of a church, a cottage, a farmhouse, and an agricultural building, all of which are timber framed, and which date from before the beginning of the 18th century.


Key

Buildings

References

Citations

Sources

Lists of buildings and structures in Shropshire